Rene Uys (born 26 July 1964) is a former South African female tennis player who was active in the first half of the 1980s. She reached a highest singles ranking of No. 39 in October 1984.

Tennis career
Uys was the runner-up at the girls' singles event at the 1981 Wimbledon Championships, losing the final to Zina Garrison in three sets. Her best result at a Grand Slam singles event was reaching the fourth round at the 1985 Wimbledon Championships in which she was defeated in straight sets by first-seeded and eventual champion Martina Navratilova.

In April 1984, she reached the final of the WTA event in Durban, South Africa, followed by a semifinal spot at the South African Open in Johannesburg.

Career finals

Singles (1 titles, 1 runners-up)

ITF finals

Singles (5–8)

Doubles (2–0)

References

External links
 
 

South African female tennis players
1964 births
Living people
Sportspeople from Bloemfontein